Teppo Felin (born 1970s) is the Douglas D. Anderson Professor of Strategy & Entrepreneurship at the Huntsman School of Business at Utah State University. He is also the Founding Director of the Institute for Interdisciplinary Study. From 2013 to 2021, Felin was Professor of Strategy at the Saïd Business School at the University of Oxford. His current research focuses on cognition, rationality, perception, organizational economics, markets and strategy.

Life and work 
Born in Helsinki, Finland, Felin obtained a Ph.D. from the David Eccles School of Business at the University of Utah.

After his graduation in 2005, he was appointed as an associate professor at the Marriott School of Management at Brigham Young University. In 2013, he was appointed Professor of Strategy at the Saïd Business School at the University of Oxford in the United Kingdom. He was a visiting professor at the Goizueta Business School at Emory University in 2004-05, and at the Helsinki University of Technology in 2007. He is co-editor of the journal Strategic Organization and associate editor of Academy of Management Annals. His research has been published in Academy of Management Review, Journal of Management, Organization Science, PLOS ONE, MIT Sloan Management Review, Journal of Management Studies, Erkenntnis, and other research outlets. In 2012, he edited a special issue on markets, aggregation and the wisdom of crowds (in the journal Managerial and Decision Economics) which included contributions from political scientist Scott E. Page, economist Bruno Frey, economist Nicolai J. Foss, economist Peter Leeson, social psychologist Steve Kozlowski, organizational scholar Margit Osterloh, physicist Claudio Castellano, biologist David Sumpter, sociologist Robb Willer, and many others.

In the early 2000s, Felin, Nicolai J. Foss, and Peter Abell were engaged in research on the foundations of organizations and strategy, which resulted in the 2005 article "Strategic organization: A field in search of micro-foundations." He is doing research with biologist Stuart Kauffman on the emergence of novelty in economic settings. This work has recently been applied to the context of the United States Constitution and the problem of designing laws. This article received responses from Constitutional scholars Steven G. Calabresi and Sanford Levinson and Nobel Laureate Vernon L. Smith. In 2015, Teppo Felin interviewed entrepreneur and venture capitalist Peter Thiel at the University of Oxford.

Felin is also doing research with mathematician Jan Koenderink and psychologist Joachim Krueger (Brown University) on the nature of cognition, rationality and perception. A general audience version of this research was published in Aeon Magazine, under the title "The Fallacy of Obviousness". Related to this essay, Felin was interviewed by economist Russ Roberts for the podcast EconTalk. He has also collaborated with theoretical physicist George Ellis and biologist Denis Noble on a set of articles published in the journal Genome Biology.

Selected publications 

Articles, a selection:
 Felin, Teppo, and Nicolai J. Foss. "Strategic organization: A field in search of micro-foundations." Strategic organization 3.4 (2005): 441.
 Felin, Teppo, and William S. Hesterly. "The knowledge-based view, nested heterogeneity, and new value creation: Philosophical considerations on the locus of knowledge." Academy of Management Review 32.1 (2007): 195-218.
 King, Brayden G., Teppo Felin, and David A. Whetten. "Finding the organization in organizational theory: A meta-theory of the organization as a social actor." Organization Science 21.1 (2010): 290-305.
 Felin, Teppo, and Todd R Zenger. "Closed or open innovation? Problem solving and the governance choice." Research Policy 43.5 (2014): 914-925.

References

External links
 Teppo Felin Personal website at sites.google.com
 Teppo Felin, University of Oxford website

1970s births
Living people
Finnish academics
Finnish business theorists
David Eccles School of Business alumni
Brigham Young University faculty
Academics of Saïd Business School
Finnish expatriates in the United States
Finnish expatriates in the United Kingdom